Monmouth Rowing Club is located on the banks of the River Wye in Monmouth, the county town of the historic county of Monmouthshire, Wales.  The club is affiliated with the Welsh Amateur Rowing Association (WARA) and hosts several annually organised race events.

Location
Monmouth is the furthest south of the three rowing clubs on the River Wye; the other two being at Hereford and Ross-on-Wye. The boathouse is sited on the western bank of the river. All rowing activities take place upstream of the 17th-century Wye Bridge and during the summer are limited to the  stretch of river between Monmouth and Hadnock.  During times of higher river levels, typically over the winter months, it is possible to row 9 km upstream to the Symonds Yat rapids.

Monmouth School boathouse stands on the opposite bank to the town club.

History
The club was thought to have been founded in 1929 prior to the uncovering of documents that indicate a date in mid-1928. Originally, the club leased an existing warehouse to act as a boathouse until the mid-1960s when the current building was erected.

The clubhouse, gym and changing rooms attached to the boathouse were extended and renovated in 1995. The new facilities were officially opened by Steve Redgrave.

Currently, the Monmouth Rowing Club boathouse also plays host to boats and equipment from Haberdashers' Monmouth School for Girls Rowing Club (founded 1990) and Monmouth Comprehensive School Boat Club (founded 1992).

Racing at Monmouth
In recent years a sprint regatta held over  has been added to the programme on the Saturday of the same weekend. Whilst multi-lane regattas, held on lakes and purpose built courses, have increased in popularity over recent years, Monmouth regatta still attracts a substantial number of entries (approx 400 boats) on both days, year on year.

Outside of the regatta season, Monmouth hosts two main Head of the River races: the Autumn Head, at the end of September, and the Winter Head in mid December.

Recent Successes
Monmouth has developed a particularly strong men's veteran squad in recent years, culminating in their winning 4 titles at the National Veteran Rowing Championships of Great Britain in June 2009

Honours

British champions

References

External links
 Monmouth Rowing Club
 Welsh Amateur Rowing Association

Rowing clubs in Wales
Sports clubs established in 1928
Rowing club
River Wye
1928 establishments in Wales
Rowing clubs of the River Wye